Sharma and Beyond is a 1984 British TV movie, directed by Brian Gilbert and starring Michael Maloney, Robert Urquhart, Tom Wilkinson and Suzanne Burden.

Goldcrest Films invested £504,000 in the film and received £340,000 earning them a loss of £164,000.

References

External links
 
 
 

1984 films